Health care sharing ministries (HCSM) are organizations in the United States in which health care costs are shared among members with common ethical or religious beliefs in a risk-pooling framework in some ways analogous to, but distinct from, health insurance.

Members of health care sharing ministries are exempt from the individual mandate requirement of the U.S. Patient Protection and Affordable Care Act of 2010 (the individual shared responsibility provision was repealed in December 2017, effective in 2019).  This means members of health care sharing ministries were not required to have insurance as outlined in the individual mandate, which was later repealed.

Approximately 31 states have safe harbor laws distinguishing healthcare ministries from health insurance organizations. Some of the larger health care sharing ministries are Christian Healthcare Ministries (founded in 1981), Medi-Share, a program of Christian Care Ministry (1993), Samaritan Ministries (1994), Liberty HealthShare (1998, originally established by Mennonites), United Refuah HealthShare, MCS Medical Cost Sharing Altrua HealthShare, Freedom HealthShare, Unite Health Share Ministries, and Trinity HealthShare (1997).

History

Predecessors to health care sharing ministries date back to at least the early 1900s. For many decades, "in Amish and Mennonite communities across the [US], people pooled their money to lighten the burden of debt for individuals during hard times." In the late 20th century, this broadened out to larger communities by larger cost-sharing ministries within the Christian community.

Most health care sharing ministries are oriented toward practicing Christians and aligned with ideals or principles found in the Christian Bible, primarily translated to mean believers have a responsibility to assist in meeting each other's needs. Such ministries often cite a biblical verse in the book of Galatians, from the New Testament, as a mandate applicable to medical costs, specifically Verse 2 in Chapter 6, in which the Apostle Paul said "Bear one another's burdens, and thus fulfill the law of Christ." Some ministries view verses 44–45 in Chapter 2 of the Book of Acts, also from the New Testament, which states that early Christians "were together and had everything in common" and "gave to anyone as he had need," as the basis for their founding.
Other health cost-sharing organizations are more secular.  For example, Sedera Health asks their members to "live a healthy lifestyle" but does not explicitly emphasize any religious obligations.

Several states have tried to block health care sharing ministries on the grounds that they are selling unauthorized insurance. For example, the State of Oklahoma contested Medi-Share in 2007 for marketing information that promoted the cost-sharing option as "insurance", but that issue was resolved when they changed their approach, and by 2010, Medi-Share was able to operate in Oklahoma once again.  A majority of states, however, have enacted safe harbor laws specifying that the ministries are not insurance and do not need to be regulated as such. In addition, the  U.S. Department of Health and Human Services issues exemption letters to ministries that have met the criteria to operate independently of the Affordable Care Act.

In 2010, at the time the U.S. Patient Protection and Affordable Care Act was passed, there were estimated to be about 100,000 people belonging to some type of medical bill-sharing ministry.
By 2014, it was estimated to be 160,000; and by 2018, that number in the US had grown to 1 million.

The future of health care sharing ministries after Obamacare's individual mandate repeal was unclear, but a work published by Harvard Law School suggested that many people may continue to use them, and they could even expand for people ineligible for healthcare subsidies (i.e. above the income threshold).

Membership
According to Alliance of Health Care Sharing Ministries, a trade association of sharing ministries, over 1 million Americans participated in health care sharing , sharing more than $670 million in medical bills annually. A January 2015 op-ed in The New York Times stated that the four main healthcare ministries in the US have a total combined membership of about 340,000, that membership has grown significantly because of the healthcare ministries' exemption to the insurance mandate of the Affordable Care Act, and that monthly cost of membership in a health care sharing ministry is generally lower than the cost of insurance rates.  The Seattle Times also reported that membership had grown significantly, in a 2015 article.

Most health sharing ministries tend to have restrictions.   They usually require members to be in good health and make a statement of belief, as well. For instance, Samaritan Ministries requires a statement of Christian faith including belief in the true God and divinity of Jesus; Liberty HealthShare and Freedom HealthShare are more inclusive, accepting members with a wide variety of religious and ethical beliefs.

All such ministries require that members subscribe to the principles of individual responsibility for their own health and of helping others in need.

Requirements under the Affordable Care Act
In order for members to be exempt from the tax penalties outlined in the Affordable Care Act, ministries must meet the following qualifications:
 Must be a 501(c)(3) organization
 Members must share common ethical or religious beliefs
 Must not discriminate membership based on state of residence or employment
 Members cannot lose membership due to development of a medical condition
 Must have (or a predecessor must have) existed and been in practice continually since December 31, 1999 (a grandfather clause)
 Must be subject to an annual audit by an independent CPA which must be publicly available upon request

The five ministries that meet these qualifications are: Christian Healthcare Ministries, Liberty HealthShare, Medi-Share, Samaritan Ministries,  OneShare.

MCS Medical Cost Sharing, founded after 1999, does not meet the qualifications, but offers to pay the tax penalties incurred by members.

Altrua HealthShare has also been recognized as a qualifying health care sharing ministry, due to its merger with Blessed Assurance Bulletin.

Anabaptist Healthshare is recognized as a health care sharing ministry by the U.S. Department of Health & Human Services.

In 2017, a healthcare sharing organization tailored to Jews, United Refuah, was launched. The group claims to be recognized as a healthcare sharing organization by the Centers for Medicare & Medicaid Services (CMS).

Tax deductibility

Monthly share payments are not deductible from US federal income tax as either a medical expense (because it is not a payment for insurance) or a charitable deduction (because it is a payment for goods and services).  Member payment in excess of their required monthly minimum, however, may be deductible as a charitable contribution.  In a proposed rule, dated June 8, 2020 the IRS has proposed to change the deductibility of share payments.

Criticism 

Health insurance brokers in Massachusetts are not allowed to market health care sharing ministry memberships to consumers, to avoid misleading consumers into thinking they are low-price guaranteed-issue insurance plans. HCSMs are not required to cover pre-existing conditions, which has led to disputes over denial of payment.

In 2020, the California Department of Insurance issued a cease and desist order to Aliera Healthcare, Inc., and Trinity Healthshares, Inc., founded by Timothy Moses and his wife Shelley Steele, for violating California law by misleading California consumers into purchasing their products. It is estimated that Aliera and the Moses family pocketed 84% of member monthly plan sharing, allowing for up to 16% to be invested into the healthcare sharing ministry fund and drawing much criticism, as Affordable Care Act health plans require up to 80% of premiums to be paid towards medical plans. 

In June 2021 comedian John Oliver set up a healthcare sharing ministry in Florida called Our Lady of Perpetual Health (following his earlier satire Our Lady of Perpetual Exemption), satirizing what HCSMs are allowed to do by law, essentially having no obligation to provide any care.

See also
Benefit society

Notes

References

Further reading 

 
 
 
 
 
  (or via EBSCO)
 
 
 
 
 
 
  (As published with advertising)

External links 
 
 Alliance of Health Care Sharing Ministries

Healthcare cost sharing organizations
Health policy in the United States